Dohole is a village in the Thane district of Maharashtra, India. It is located in the Bhiwandi taluka. It lies on AH47 (Mumbai-Nashik highway).

Demographics 

According to the 2011 census of India, Dohole has 361 households. The effective literacy rate (i.e. the literacy rate of population excluding children aged 6 and below) is 67.39%.

References 

Villages in Bhiwandi taluka